The  is a major river in the northern Kantō region of Japan. Located entirely within Gunma Prefecture, it is one of the prefecture's major rivers. It is also a major tributary of the Tone River. The river is an important source of hydroelectric power, and 17 power plants are located on its banks.

Geography 
The source of the Agatsuma River is Torii Pass ( in altitude), on the border of Gunma and Nagano Prefectures. It gathers tributaries from Mount Asama and Mount Kusatsu-Shirane and flows into the Tone River in Shibukawa city. The Agatsuma River drains most of northwest Gunma Prefecture.
The middle section of the river is known for its scenic beauty as it flows through the narrow Agatsuma Canyon. The controversial construction of the Yanba Dam would destroy this area.

Transportation
The East Japan Railway Company's Agatsuma Line (a single track line) runs along the river from Shibukawa Station in the east to the terminus at Omae Station in the west.
Roughly divided into three sections, the river can be travelled by road using three National Highways: National Route 353 (in the east), National Route 145 (in the middle), and National Route 144 (in the west).

References

External links

Rivers of Gunma Prefecture
Rivers of Japan